Kaygusuz is a Turkish surname. Notable people with the surname include:

Kaygusuz Abdal (1341–1444), Turkish folk poet of the 14th century
Selman Kaygusuz (born 1963), Turkish wrestler 
Sema Kaygusuz (born 1972), Turkish novelist, playwright, essayist, and short story writer

Turkish-language surnames